Riverina Rhinos is an Australian association football club based in the city of Griffith, New South Wales. The club was founded in 2014 and as of 2017 competes in the ACT based NPL Capital Football.

History

Foundation and early years
Riverina Rhinos were founded in 2014 as a junior club and competed in the NSW State League system. Originally the club was accepted into the NSW Regional League and Regional Conference for U12s - U15s where it competed for three years.

Move to NPL Capital Football
7 November 2016, Capital Football announced the introduction of Riverina Rhinos for the men's and boy's National Premier Leagues Capital Football for 2017 onwards. As part of the announcement, Capital Football CEO Phil Brown said the organisation was looking forward to having another strong club join the growing league.

18 November 2016, Capital Football CEO Phil Brown was questioned by the media regarding the introduction of Riverina Rhinos being linked to a secret proposition by the federation body to submit a proposal for a future Canberra based A-League team. The addition of the Riverina region to a Capital Football bid would significantly bring the bid closer to the one million people catchment benchmark that FFA chief executive David Gallop has supposedly set as one of the criteria for interested bids. Phil Brown confirmed the Riverina Rhinos will be joining the ACT NPL leagues system but rejected it was connected to a future A-League bid.

The Rhinos finished its first season in the NPL in 9th place in the league, two points above wooden spooners Monaro Panthers and eight points behind 8th placed Woden-Weston FC. Riverina did not qualify for the finals series.

Players

Current squad

Season-by-season results
The below table is updated with the statistics and final results for Riverina Rhinos following the conclusion of each National Premier League Capital Football season.

References

External links

 Official club website
 Official club Facebook
 Capital Football home
 NPL Capital Football home

Association football clubs established in 2014
2014 establishments in Australia
Soccer clubs in the Australian Capital Territory
Soccer clubs in New South Wales
National Premier Leagues clubs